Gen. Benjamín Guillermo Hill Salido (born 31 March 1874, Choix, Sinaloa, – died 14 December 1920, Mexico City) was a military commander during the Mexican Revolution.  He was a cousin of revolutionary general and later president Álvaro Obregón Salido, whom he supported from the beginning of his rise to power. He was called "Obregón's lost right arm," alluding to the arm his cousin lost in the 1915 Battle of Celaya, defeating General Pancho Villa.

Early life
Hill's paternal grandfather, William Hill, was an American-born physician who fought with the army of the Confederate States of America in the American Civil War (1861-65). As with a number of Confederates following the southern defeat, Hill emigrated.  He went to Álamos, Sonora, where he married Jesusa Salido. Their third child was Benjamin Hill Salido.  Jesusa's sister Cenobia, who had eighteen children, the last of which was Álvaro Obregón Salido, making Hill and Obregón cousins. While the Obregón family's fortunes waned, especially after the death of Cenobia's husband when Obregón was a toddler, the Hill family sent Benjamin to study in a military academy and then sent him to Milan and Rome. He fell in love with an Italian countess, whose family objected to the match, but the couple eloped and returned to Mexico. She died in childbirth during her first pregnancy. Hill subsequently married a local Sonoran woman.

Career
Following the call of Francisco I. Madero he joined the revolution in 1910. He was briefly imprisoned in the city of Hermosillo, Sonora, during 1911. He used what was called the "nitroglycerine method of attack," a method used when Federal forces had overwhelming numbers. Rebels also used dum-dum bullets that did lethal damage. The press in Mexico City criticized such methods as being "unchivalrous.". When Madero was trying to consolidate his hold, he placed Hill as commander of Cananea, a place of labor unrest. Hill "a combination of resolve and conciliation averted trouble."
 
In 1912, he fought against the rebellion led by Pascual Orozco and, following the 1913 coup d'état of Victoriano Huerta, he joined the northwestern corps of the Constitutionalist Army, which would ultimately be commanded by his kinsman Álvaro Obregón. He fought alongside Obregón in the campaigns against Francisco "Pancho" Villa in the Bajío. He served as Governor of Sonora from August 1914 until January 1915. Obregón had not joined the early Maderista phase of the revolution, but once he did, Hill supported his rise in military ranks despite grumblings of some who had fought for Madero.

Hill was an extremely able Constitutionalist Army commander, put in charge of Mexico City in 1915.  Following the victory of Venustiano Carranza's Constitutionalist Army, whose most distinguished general was his relative Álvaro Obregón,  Hill was promoted to Divisional General.

Obregón had returned to Sonora after Carranza's election, but announced his candidacy for the 1920 presidential elections in which Carranza was constitutionally unable to run. However, Carranza designated Ignacio Bonillas as his candidate for the presidency. Hill, Obregón, Plutarco Elías Calles, and Adolfo de la Huerta formed a plan in 1920 against Carranza's plans. Hill was one of the main proponents of the Plan of Agua Prieta, fighting in the military rebellions that ensued. Hill and other former Constitutionalists accompanied Obregón on his triumphal entry into Mexico City.

When Obregón assumed the presidency on 1 December 1920, he appointed Hill as his Secretary of War and the Navy. He was seen as a potential presidential successor to Obregón, which brought him into conflict with Interior Secretary Plutarco Elías Calles.

Death and legacy
In 1920, Hill died at age 46 under suspicious circumstances after attending a luncheon intended to heal a rift between Hill and Calles. Calles was also in conflict with the poet José Inés Novelo. After dining, both Hill and Novelo became extremely ill, but recovered.  Hill did not.  Calles was suspected of poisoning Novelo and Hill, Obregón's kinsman and potential rival to Calles  politically. The banquet was called "The Feast of the Borgias", a family that famously used poison to eliminate rivals. A rumor was floated that Hill had died of cancer. Hill had served only two weeks as Obregón's Minister of War. He was given a full military funeral with Obregón, Calles, and other revolutionaries in attendance. Calles succeeded him in the post of Minister of War. 

The town of Benjamín Hill, Sonora, was named in his honor.

References

1874 births
1920 deaths
People from Choix Municipality
Mexican revolutionaries
People of the Mexican Revolution
Mexican generals
Deaths by poisoning
Mexican people of American descent
Mexican Secretaries of Defense
Governors of Sonora
People from Sonora
Mexican expatriates in Italy